Pyrausta acontialis is a species of moth in the family Crambidae. It is found in Spain, Portugal and France. It has also been recorded from Syria.

The wingspan is 15–16 mm.

References

Moths described in 1859
acontialis
Moths of Europe
Moths of Asia
Taxa named by Otto Staudinger